Modern Library's 100 Best Novels is a 1998 list of the best English-language novels published during the 20th century, as selected by Modern Library from among 400 novels published by Random House, which owns Modern Library. The purpose of the list was to "bring the Modern Library to public attention" and stimulate sales of its books. A separate Modern Library 100 Best Nonfiction list of the 100 best non-fiction books of the 20th century was created the same year.

Editors' list
During early 1998, the Modern Library polled its editorial board to find their opinions of the best 100 novels. The board of review consisted of Daniel J. Boorstin, A. S. Byatt, Christopher Cerf, Shelby Foote, Vartan Gregorian, Edmund Morris, John Richardson, Arthur Schlesinger Jr., William Styron and Gore Vidal.  All but Gregorian were published by Random House or an affiliate.

Ulysses by James Joyce topped the list, followed by F. Scott Fitzgerald's The Great Gatsby and Joyce's A Portrait of the Artist as a Young Man. The most recent novel in the list is  William Kennedy's Ironweed, published in 1983; the oldest is The Way of All Flesh by Samuel Butler, which was written between 1873 and 1884, but not published until 1902.  Joseph Conrad's Heart of Darkness was technically first published as a three-part serial in 1899; however, it was not published as a novel in a single volume until 1902, making it eligible for the list.  Conrad has four novels on the list, the most of any author. William Faulkner, E. M. Forster, Henry James, James Joyce, D. H. Lawrence, and Evelyn Waugh each have three novels. There are ten other authors with two novels.

The following table shows the top ten novels from the editors' list:

See also
20th Century's Greatest Hits: 100 English-Language Books of Fiction
Le Mondes 100 Books of the Century
Marcel Reich-Ranicki's anthology of exemplary German literature Der Kanon
Western canon
Great books

Notes

References

External links
The Modern Library list
 
New York Times Book Reviews of the 100 novels

20th-century novels
Lists of novels
Top book lists
American fiction awards
Awards established in 1998
1998 establishments in the United States